Hagaz (Hagaz) is a town in central Eritrea. Located in the Anseba region, it is the capital of Hagaz District. The Hagaz Agricultural and Technical School is situated here.

References
Statoids.com, retrieved December 8, 2010

Populated places in Eritrea
Anseba Region